The Roman Catholic Diocese of Machala is a diocese located in the city of Machala in the Ecclesiastical province of Cuenca in Ecuador. Established on July 26, 1954 as the Territorial Prelature of El Oro from territory of the Dioceses of Guayaquil and Cuenca, it was elevated as the Diocese of Machala on January 31, 1969.

Bishops

Ordinaries
Prelates of the Roman Catholic Territorial Prelature of El Oro
Bishop Silvio Luis Haro Alvear (1954 – 23 Mar 1955); Apostolic Administrator; previously, Auxiliary Bishop of the Roman Catholic Archdiocese of Guayaquil and Titular Bishop of Antaeopolis; subsequently, Bishop of the Roman Catholic Diocese of Ibarra
Father Vicente Felicísimo Maya Guzmán (1956 – 29 Nov 1963); Apostolic Administrator; subsequently Bishop-Prelate of El Oro, and then first Bishop of Machala
Bishop-Prelate Vicente Felicísimo Maya Guzmán (29 Nov 1963 – 31 Jan 1969); Titular Bishop of Comana pontica; previously, Apostolic Administrator of El Oro; subsequently, first Bishop of Machala 
Bishops of the Roman Catholic Diocese of Machala
Bishop Vicente Felicísimo Maya Guzmán (31 Jan 1969 – 30 Jan 1978); previously, Apostolic Administrator and then Bishop-Prelate of El Oro
Bishop Antonio José González Zumárraga (30 Jan 1978 – 28 Jun 1980); previously, Auxiliary Bishop of the Roman Catholic Archdiocese of Quito and Titular Bishop of Tagarata; subsequently, Coadjutor Archbishop and then Metropolitan Archbishop of Quito, then Cardinal-Priest of Chiesa di Santa Maria in Via, Rome, Italy, and President of the Episcopal Conference of Ecuador
Father Jesús Ramón Martínez de Ezquerecocha Suso (1980 – 14 Jan 1982); Apostolic Administrator; subsequently, Bishop-Prelate of the Roman Catholic Territorial Prelature of Los Ríos and then Bishop there (Roman Catholic Diocese of Babahoyo) 
Bishop Néstor Rafael Herrera Heredia (14 Jan 1982 – 22 Feb 2010); served as President of the Episcopal Conference of Ecuador
Bishop Luis Antonio Sánchez Armijos, S.D.B. (22 Feb 2010 – 22 Oct 2012); previously, Bishop of the Roman Catholic Diocese of Tulcán
Bishop Ángel Polivio Sánchez Loaiza (20 Jul 2013 – 27 Sep 2022); previously, Bishop of the Roman Catholic Diocese of Guaranda
Bishop Vicente Horacio Saeteros Sierra (27 Sep 2022 – ...)

Auxiliary bishop
Hermenegildo José Torres Asanza (2007-2018), appointed  Bishop of Guaranda

Special churches
Cathedral: Catedral de Nuestra Señora de la Merced, Machala
Minor Basilica: Basílica de Nuestra Señora de la Natividad de Chilla, Chilla

External links
 GCatholic.org
 Catholic Hierarchy

Roman Catholic dioceses in Ecuador
Roman Catholic Ecclesiastical Province of Cuenca
Christian organizations established in 1954
Roman Catholic dioceses and prelatures established in the 20th century
Machala
1954 establishments in Ecuador